|}

The Swinley Chase is a National Hunt Premier Handicap handicap chase in England which is open to horses aged five years or older. 
It is run at Ascot over a distance of about 3 miles (2 miles, 7 furlongs and 180 yards, or ), and during its running there are twenty fences to be jumped. It is scheduled to take place each year in February.

The race was first run in 2011, but it is effectively a reincarnation of the Whitbread Trial Handicap Chase (later the Crispin Handicap), which was first run in 1966 and last run in 1994. It is currently sponsored by Keltbray and prior to 2017 it was sponsored by Weatherbys and Appletiser. The race held Listed status until 2022 and was re-classified as a Premier Handicap from the 2023 running when Listed status was removed from handicap races.

Winners

See also 
 Horse racing in Great Britain
 List of British National Hunt races

References

Sources
Racing Post
 

National Hunt chases
National Hunt races in Great Britain
Ascot Racecourse